John Francis Dillon (July 13, 1884 – April 4, 1934) was an American film director and actor of the silent era. He directed 130 films between 1914 and 1934. He also appeared in 74 films between 1914 and 1931. He was born in New York, New York, was a brother of Robert A. Dillon, and died in Los Angeles, California from a heart attack. He was married to the actress Edith Hallor.

Partial filmography

 Dough and Dynamite (1914)
 Indiscreet Corinne (1917)
 Suds (1920)
 The Plaything of Broadway (1921)
 The Cub Reporter (1922)
 The Yellow Stain (1922)
 Flaming Youth (1923)
 Double Dealing (1923) (actor)
 The Self-Made Wife (1923)
 The Broken Violin (1923)
 Lilies of the Field (1924)
 Flirting with Love (1924)
 The Perfect Flapper (1924)
 The Half-Way Girl (1925)
 We Moderns (1925)
 The Test of Donald Norton (1926) (actor)
 Don Juan's Three Nights (1926)
 Midnight Lovers (1926)
 Love's Blindness (1926)
 The Prince of Headwaiters (1927)
 Temptations of a Shop Girl (1927) (actor)
 The Noose (1928)
 The Heart of a Follies Girl (1928)
 Out of the Ruins (1928)
 Scarlet Seas (1929)
 Sally (1929)
 Children of the Ritz (1929)
 Bride of the Regiment (1930)
 The Girl of the Golden West (1930)
 Kismet (1930)
 Millie (1931)
 The Finger Points (1931)
 The Pagan Lady (1931)
 Behind the Mask (1932)
 Call Her Savage (1932)
 The Big Shakedown (1934)

References

External links

 

1884 births
1934 deaths
American male film actors
American male silent film actors
Film directors from New York City
20th-century American male actors
Burials at Hollywood Forever Cemetery
Silent film directors